Glutaronitrile, also pentanedinitrile, is a nitrile, with formula C3H6(CN)2.

References

External links
 WebBook page for glutaronitrile

Alkanedinitriles